Valentina Georgieva (born 28 July 2006) is a Bulgarian artistic gymnast. She is the 2020 Junior European silver medalist on vault.

Career

Junior
Georgieva competed at the 2020 Junior European Championships in Mersin, where she won the silver medal on vault behind Ana Bărbosu, and finished fourteenth in the all-around. She was also the Bulgarian junior national all-around champion between 2018 and 2021.

Senior
Georgieva became age-eligible for senior competition in 2022, and made her senior international debut at the Baku World Cup, where she finished seventh in the vault final. She went on to compete at the Varna World Challenge Cup, where she qualified to both the vault and floor exercise finals, finishing seventh and sixth respectively. She won her first senior international medal at the Osijek World Challenge Cup in Croatia, taking the gold medal in the vault final ahead of Teja Belak and Tjaša Kysselef. Additionally, she finished seventh in the floor final.

Georgieva competed at the 2022 European Championships in Munich, where she qualified to the vault final in sixth place. However, she sustained an injury on the landing of her first of two vaults in the final, and could not finish the competition.  It was later reported that she had suffered a femoral fracture and a torn ACL.

Competitive history

References 

2006 births
Living people
Bulgarian female artistic gymnasts